The Doyle Monument is located in Jerbourg Point in the southeastern point of the Bailiwick of Guernsey within St Martin Parish. It was built to honor Sir John Doyle (1756-1834), Lieutenant Governor of Guernsey 1803-1816, by the people of the island.

Monuments

Original

It was built of granite and a staircase inside wound up to its summit. It had the simple inscription, "Doyle - Gratitude".

A coloured engraving of the monument appears in the book Festung Guernsey which was created by the German occupiers to document their defences of the island. The monument was demolished by German engineers in 1944 during the Occupation as Batterie Strassburg was built close to the site and it blocked the 360-degree angle of fire, photographs showing the demolition were taken.

Replacement

A second smaller monument, a granite column, was built in the same location, a small hill, at a cost of £1,400, and was completed in 1953.

References

Monumental columns
Buildings and structures in Guernsey
Buildings and structures completed in 1953
Buildings and structures completed in 1820
Tourist attractions in Guernsey